The phascogales (members of the eponymous genus Phascogale), also known as wambengers or mousesacks, are carnivorous Australian marsupials of the family Dasyuridae. There are three species: the brush-tailed phascogale (Phascogale tapoatafa), the red-tailed phascogale (P. calura), and the northern brush-tailed phascogale (P. pirata). As with a number of dasyurid species, the males live for only one year, dying after a period of frenzied mating. The term Phascogale was coined in 1824 by Coenraad Jacob Temminck in reference to the brush-tailed phascogale, and means "pouched weasel". All three species are listed as either Near Threatened or Vulnerable by the IUCN.

Phylogeny
The following is a phylogenetic tree based on mitochondrial genome sequences:

Species

The genus consists of the following three species:

Life cycle
Mating generally happens between May and July. All males die soon after mating. Females give birth to about 6 young ones about 30 days after mating. Phascogales do not have the true pouch that is found in most other marsupials .   Instead, they form temporary folds of skin - sometimes called a "pseudo-pouch"  around the mammary glands during pregnancy.  Young stay in this pseudo-pouch area, nursing for about 7 weeks before being moved to a nest where they stay until they are weaned at about 20 weeks of age. Females live for about 3 years, and generally produce one litter.

References

External links

 Brush-tailed Phascogale fact sheet: . Also: 
 Red-tailed Phascogale fact sheet: . Also: 

Dasyuromorphs
Marsupials of Australia
Marsupial genera
Taxa named by Coenraad Jacob Temminck